Elizabethan stage may refer to:

English Renaissance theatre, an English drama genre and the theatres in which it was performed
Allen Elizabethan Theatre at Oregon Shakespeare Festival, a contemporary American theatre modeled after the Renaissance-era Fortune Playhouse in London